The Forge in the Forest is a novel by Michael Scott Rohan published in 1987.

Plot summary
The Forge in the Forest is a novel in which an immense perilous journey is taken.

Reception
Dave Langford reviewed The Forge in the Forest for White Dwarf #88, and stated that "parts of which I found myself skipping, only to enjoy the vivid highlights of battle, smithcraft [...] and above all the Power and geography of the inhospitable Ice."

Reviews
Review by Valerie Housden (1987) in Vector 138
Review by Pauline Morgan (1987) in Fantasy Review, June 1987
Review by Ken Brown (1987) in Interzone, #21 Autumn 1987

References

1987 novels